Mahanadi Vihar is a residential area in Cuttack, Orissa, India. It is situated in a tongue of land formed by the Mahanadi River and National Highway 16. The area is named after the river and comes under the control of the CDA (Cuttack Development Authority). Schools, a college, hospitals, temples, parks, playgrounds, markets and banks can be found there and Dussera and Puja take place there.

It is well connected by rail and road services with the nearest railway station being Cuttack and nearest bus stand is at Shikhar Pur, OMP.

Located close by are Shri Ramachandra Bhanj Medical College, Gurudwara GuruNanak Datan Sahib (KaliaBoda), Katak Chandi Temple, Barabati Stadium and Ravenshaw University. For last few years the local Puja Committee has won the "Best Disciplined Committee" award presented by the Cuttack Municipality Corporation (CMC) from among 100 Puja committees.

Most of the people living in Mahanadi Vihar are government employees (doctors, engineers, lawyers, Central and State Government employees) along with a few businessmen and executives from the private sector.

Shopping malls

Reliance fresh, The Grains Shopping mall, Sai World (Home appliances), Pride Mart, More Mart and Sriram Mart.

Clubs and organizations

Sanjeebani Library & Youth Organization in Mahanadivihar is a social organization, President:Mr.Janmejay Das, Secretary:Mr.Dipak Kumar Routray, with over 100 members. Activities conducted are Health camp, Education camp, Plantation & Sports (Indoor & Outdoor). This organization is a single state labelled Library & Youth organization in Mahanadivihar. A Panchmukhi Hanumana mandir (50 m) of Sanjibani Chowk, Shirdi sai baba mandir (10 m) of Saraswati Shishu Vidya mandir. Akndalmani mandir, Jagaganth mandir Mangala mandir at mahandi vihar. Three clubs at Mahanadi vihar are Miracle, Aryan Club (1987)& Golden. Two marriage mandaps Haramani Mandap and Celebration Mandap.

Temples

There are several temples such as Sri Panchmukhi hanumana mandir, Sri Jaganath Temple, Maa Mangala Temple, Siv Mandir and others.

Hospital and medical facility

Mahanadi Vihar has good medical facilities, serving hospitals Shakti, Moon, Moon Research Center and Sabarmati. Apart from this there are several clinics operating there and also it has a number of nursing homes and a nursing school.

Cuttack